Gordon Westcott (born Myrthus Hickman, November 6, 1903 – October 30, 1935) was an American film actor.

Biography
Born in St. George, Utah, in 1903, Westcott studied architecture at the University of Chicago, where he was also lightweight boxing champion of the university. Westcott was a member of the Church of Jesus Christ of Latter-day Saints.

Westcott acted on stage in New York, Utah, and California, before he made the move to film.

He became a contract player with Warner Brothers and appeared in 37 films between 1928 and 1935, starring alongside such up and comers as Bette Davis, Loretta Young and James Cagney.

After appearing in a string of Pre-Code productions, and working with such directors as William A. Wellman, Busby Berkeley and William Dieterle, his film career ended with his death on October 30, 1935 from a skull fracture sustained in a polo accident that occurred three days earlier. He was 31 years old and survived by his second wife and two children.

Family
His son, from a brief 1922 marriage to Margaret Cardon Hickman (1902–1991), was Louis C. Hickman (1922–2016). His daughter, by Hazel Bethea McArthur, was actress Helen Westcott (1928–1998).

Filmography

References

External links

 
 

 

1903 births
1935 deaths
American male film actors
American male silent film actors
Male actors from Utah
People from St. George, Utah
20th-century American male actors
Burials at Forest Lawn Memorial Park (Glendale)
Polo deaths
American Latter Day Saints